Truskmore South-East Cairn is the highest point in Leitrim at  above sea level. It is part of Truskmore mountain and is located approximately 0.45 km southeast of the mountain's summit, which is  higher and located in County Sligo. 

Truskmore SE Cairn's prominence is recorded as 0 m which means it appears in very few lists of mountains in Ireland.

See also

Truskmore
List of Irish counties by highest point
Lists of mountains in Ireland
Lists of mountains and hills in the British Isles

References

Mountains and hills of County Leitrim
Highest points of Irish counties